Sir John Michael Gorst (28 June 1928 – 31 July 2010) was a British Conservative politician.

Career
He was educated at Ardingly College and read French and History at Corpus Christi College, Cambridge.  In 1953 he joined the advertising department of Pye Ltd. 

At the 1964 general election he fought Chester-le-Street and in 1966, he was again an unsuccessful candidate in the Bodmin constituency in Cornwall, losing to the sitting Liberal MP, Peter Bessell.

At the 1970 general election, he was elected MP for Hendon North, holding the seat until it was abolished by boundary changes in 1997. In December 1996, he resigned the Conservative whip in protest at the closure of a casualty unit at a local hospital. This deprived John Major of his parliamentary majority. 

In the 1997 general election, he stood in the new seat of Hendon, losing to Labour's Andrew Dismore.

Family
He was the great-grandson of Sir John Eldon Gorst. Gorst married Noël Rossana, a ballerina, in 1954.

References

External links 
 

1928 births
2010 deaths
People educated at Ardingly College
Alumni of Corpus Christi College, Cambridge
Conservative Party (UK) MPs for English constituencies
Knights Bachelor
UK MPs 1970–1974
UK MPs 1974
UK MPs 1974–1979
UK MPs 1979–1983
UK MPs 1983–1987
UK MPs 1987–1992
UK MPs 1992–1997
Politicians awarded knighthoods